is the second full-length album released by the Japanese boyband Kanjani Eight. The album was released with three different versions, two limited editions and one regular edition. The regular edition release of the album and both limited edition releases came with a bonus CD featuring the member solos. The limited edition A, however, also came with a DVD movie entitled "Zukkoke Treasure Panic!". Limited Edition B featured a hidden bonus track on the Member Solos disc.

Musically, the album is a complete 180 from their previous album. Majority of the songs are of the Funk/Disco genre, notable tracks being "Big Sky Blues", "Speedy Wonder", and the album's title track, " Great Escape ~Dai Dassou~ ". Kanjani Eight do dive right back into their 'enka/kayokyoku' roots with the song, "Futari no Namida Ame", but the rest of the album takes off with generic pop and rock. The most noticeable change in this album, compared to last, is the creative control the group displays in the member solos. All the solos, save for You Yokoyama's, were written and/or composed by the members themselves.

Front man of the Osaka-native Japanese rock band, The Inazuma Sentai, wrote several songs for this album. Due to the success and popularity of these songs, Jouya Uenaka returned again to write several other songs for the group.

CD Track listing

CD 1

CD 2

DVD: Zukkoke Treasure Panic

The DVD Movie that came with the limited edition A version of this album was 15 minutes long. The movie is about seven individuals trapped in a cave. Each member assumes a stereotypical RPG character role. Once they name themselves, the King (You Yokoyama) has a fit and throws his crown, activating the laser security. Smith, the priest, (Ryo Nishikido) notices that there's treasure at the other side of the temple. The King orders Tony, the hunter, (Shota Yasuda) to get it and then they all start to run for the treasure. Suddenly they realize that the entire temple is booby trapped and now have to avoid the traps while racing each other to the treasure.

Eventually they start to turn on each other and things get chaotic. After Gurus, the Vagabond, (Ryuhei Maruyama) has had enough of being the one most subjected the booby traps, he runs towards the treasure chest, triggering all the traps and the group makes a mad dash. When they reach the treasure chest, they open it up to reveal Kanjani8 sitting around a table playing a video game—Which turns out to be that they're the video game Kanjani8 is playing. After arguing with their video game counterparts, Kanjani8 resets the video game.

Cast
The King - You Yokoyama
Cabinet Minister - Shingo Murakami
The Magician, Raichou the Second - Subaru Shibutani
Gurus, The Vagabond - Ryuhei Maruyama
Tony, The Hunter - Shota Yasuda
Smith, The Priest - Ryo Nishikido
Tadayoshi, The Hero - Tadayoshi Okura

Charts

References

2007 albums
Kanjani Eight albums